Vagabond were a UK band and signed to the newly reformed Geffen Records UK.

The band released their debut album, You Don't Know the Half of It on 17 August 2009. You Don't Know the Half of It was produced by Xenomania, who have previously worked with Girls Aloud, Sugababes, Cher, Gabriella Cilmi and Kylie Minogue. The Guardian featured Vagabond as "New Band of the Day" on 20 February 2009, and the newspaper also declared "They could be the world's biggest new band."

"Sweat (Until the Morning)" was released as the first single from the album as a free download on 8 June 2009, followed by "Don't Wanna Run No More" which was released on 3 August 2009. You Don't Know the Half of It was released on 17 August 2009.

Vagabond toured in the UK in 2009 and in addition to doing their own headline shows, have supported artists such as James Morrison, McFly and the Script. Vagabond also performed at the Glastonbury, T in the Park and V music festivals in the UK. On 16 February 2010, the band announced they had split amicably.

Band members
Alex Vargas - vocals, acoustic guitar
Luke Fitton - lead guitar, backing vocals
Stephen Carter - rhythm guitar, backing vocals
Sam Odiwe - bass
Karl Penney - drums

Discography

Albums

Singles

References

External links
 Myspace.com/vagabond
 Youtube.com/vagabondtheband
 Bebo.com/vagabond
 The Jitty Interview Vagabond

English pop music groups
Musical groups established in 2008
Musical groups disestablished in 2010
Polydor Records artists
Geffen Records artists